Glendonald is a locality on the Northern rural fringe of the City of Ballarat municipality in Victoria, Australia.

References

Suburbs of Ballarat